Events in the year 2023 in Malaysia.

Federal level 
 Yang di-Pertuan Agong: Al-Sultan Abdullah of Pahang
 Raja Permaisuri Agong: Tunku Azizah of Pahang
 Deputy Yang di-Pertuan Agong: Sultan Nazrin Shah of Perak
 Prime Minister: Anwar Ibrahim 
 Deputy Prime Ministers: Ahmad Zahid Hamidi & Fadillah Yusof 
 Chief Justice: Tengku Maimun Tuan Mat

State level 
  :
Sultan of Johor: Sultan Ibrahim Ismail
 Menteri Besar of Johor: Onn Hafiz Ghazi 
  :
 Sultan of Kedah: Sultan Sallehuddin
 Menteri Besar of Kedah: Muhammad Sanusi Md Nor
  :
 Sultan of Kelantan: Sultan Muhammad V 
 Menteri Besar of Kelantan: Ahmad Yaakob
  :
 Raja of Perlis: Tuanku Syed Sirajuddin
 Menteri Besar of Perlis: Mohd Shukri Ramli
  :
 Sultan of Perak: Sultan Nazrin Shah
 Menteri Besar of Perak: Saarani Mohamad
  :
 Sultan of Pahang: Sultan Abdullah Al Haj 
 Menteri Besar of Pahang: Wan Rosdy Wan Ismail
  :
 Sultan of Selangor: Sultan Sharafuddin Idris Shah
 Menteri Besar of Selangor: Amirudin Shari
  :
 Sultan of Terengganu: Sultan Mizan Zainal Abidin
 Menteri Besar of Terengganu: Ahmad Samsuri Mokhtar
  :
 Yang di-Pertuan Besar of Negeri Sembilan: Tuanku Muhriz
 Menteri Besar of Negeri Sembilan: Aminuddin Harun
  :
 Yang di-Pertua Negeri of Penang: Ahmad Fuzi Abdul Razak
 Chief Minister of Penang: Chow Kon Yeow
  :
 Yang di-Pertua Negeri of Malacca: Mohd Ali Rustam
 Chief Minister of Malacca: Sulaiman Md Ali
  :
 Yang di-Pertua Negeri of Sarawak: Abdul Taib Mahmud
 Premier of Sarawak: Abang Johari Openg
  :
 Yang di-Pertua Negeri of Sabah: Juhar Mahiruddin
 Chief Minister of Sabah: Hajiji Noor

Events

January 

 January 1 – 
All gaming premises and lottery shops in Kedah ceased operations and were closed following the decision of the state government not to renew their licenses that expired on 31 December 2022.
Juhar Mahiruddin was officially reappointed and sworn in as the Yang di-Pertua Negeri of Sabah for his fourth term from 1 January 2023 to 31 December 2024.
A Jakel Outlet in Shah Alam caught on fire, burning most of the building.
 January 5
Former prime minister Najib Razak, who has been imprisoned for more than four months now, filed a petition with the United Nations Human Rights Council Working Group on Arbitrary Detention (UNWGAD) to seek his release from prison or a retrial of his SRC International Sdn Bhd case.
The High Court acquitted Shahrir Abdul Samad from a money-laundering case over his alleged failure to include an RM1 million cheque from Najib Razak in his income tax declaration, after the prosecution decided to discontinue the case.
 January 8
 Bung Moktar Radin step down as Sabah Football Association president 
 PKR fired Tian Chua and 4 others 
 January 9
 MCMC announces new interim chairman 
 Maqis seizes 160 tonnes of pest-infested copra from Indonesia 
 Ex-Goldman banker Roger Ng granted a discharge not amounting to acquittal pending the outcome of US trial 
 National Registration Department digitising 150 million physical records kept since 1869 
 KDM state they support for Hajiji Noor as the chief minister 
 January 10
 Online purchases under RM 500 to cost 10% extra on 1 April aka LVG Tax 
 Malaysia receives 31600 quota for hajj pilgrims 
  Datuk Sudha Devi KR Vasudevan reappointed as  Commonwealth Foundation for two years term 
 Sabah introduces state bills for gas supply and Energy Commission of Sabah 
 Entrepreneur Development Ministry has postpone repayment of total RM128.6 million microcredit loans 
 SMK Methodist Sibu won at Faber-Castell's student olympics 
11 January
 Michelle Yeoh won Oscar award 
 Goh Liu Ying retired from the badminton after 13 years 
 Hajiji reshuffle his cabinet 
January 12
Two Pan-Borneo Highway packages completed

Predicted and scheduled events
2023 Men's FIH Hockey Junior World Cup
2023 Penang state election
2023 Selangor state election
2023 Negeri Sembilan state election
2023 Kelantan state election
2023 Terengganu state election
2023 Kedah state election

Deaths

January 
12 January – Azlan Zainol, Chairman of Malaysia Building Society Bhd
22 January – Mahani Idris, wife of former Minister of Finance, Daim Zainuddin.
23 January – Abd Rani Osman,  former Selangor state assemblyman for Meru.
29 January – Gopal Sri Ram, former Senior Deputy Public Prosecutor.

February 
7 February – Tunku Abdul Aziz Ibrahim, former Senator.
10 February – Yunus Rahmat, former MP for Jelebu.
23 February – Mohd Kamal Hassan, former Rector of the International Islamic University Malaysia.

March 
3 March – Lee San Choon, former MCA President.
8 March – Syed Razak Syed Zain Barakbah, former Menteri Besar of Kedah.

References

 
2020s in Malaysia
Malaysia
Years of the 21st century in Malaysia
Malaysia